Salvia hayatae is an annual herb that is native to the foothills of Taiwan. Inflorescences are 2–5 flowered verticillasters, widely spaced at the bottom and crowded at the top, in terminal racemes or panicles.

There are two named varieties: S. hayatae var. hayatae has leaves that are 2-pinnately compound, while S.  hayatae var. pinnata has leaves that are 1-pinnately compound.

References

hayatae
Flora of China